Scott Justin Freeman (born June 20, 1979 in Dallas, Texas) is a retired American  voice actor and convicted sex offender. He is known for his work for Funimation, most notably as Issei Hyoudou in High School DxD, England in Hetalia: Axis Powers, Takashi Kosuda in B Gata H Kei, Yuji Sakamoto in Baka and Test, Pierce Aogami in A Certain Magical Index and Hayato Narita in We Without Wings.

Legal issues
On April 5, 2014, Freeman was arrested for eight counts of possession of child pornography. On July 30, 2015, Freeman was convicted and sentenced to three years in the Texas Department of Criminal Justice. In response, Funimation announced that they had terminated their relationship with Freeman, and his ongoing roles were replaced with other voice actors. Freeman served his sentence at the Joe F. Gurney Unit in Anderson County, Texas until he was paroled in 2018. Freeman currently lives in Papillion, Nebraska. As of 2023, his current activity is unknown.

Filmography

Anime

Film

Video games

References

External links
 

1979 births
Living people
American male video game actors
American male voice actors
American people convicted of child pornography offenses
Male actors from Dallas
Prisoners and detainees of Texas
21st-century American criminals
21st-century American male actors